Roberto Sosa (18 April 1930 – 23 May 2011) was an author and poet born in Yoro, Honduras. He spent his early life working hard to help provide for his poor family. When he was almost thirty years old, he published his first book.

Sosa published Los Pobres in 1969, which won the Adonais Prize in Spain. Un Mundo Para Todos Dividido, published in 1971, won the Casa de las Americas Prize in Cuba. By 1990, he had published six books of poetry, three of prose, and two anthologies of Honduran literature. In 1990, he published Obra Completa (Complete Works).

The Difficult Days, Poems, The Common Grief, and The Return of the River have all been translated into English.

At the time of his death, Sosa lived in Tegucigalpa, the capital city of Honduras. He was the editor of a magazine, Presente, and the president of the Honduras Journalists’ Union. He also taught literature at the Universidad Nacional Autónoma de Honduras.

Literary work 

 1959: Caligramas (Tegucigalpa).
 1966: Muros (Tegucigalpa).
 1967: Mar interior'' (Tegucigalpa).
 1967: Breve estudio sobre la poesía y su creación
 1968: Los pobres (Madrid).
 1971: Un mundo para todos dividido (La Habana).
 1981: Prosa armada
 1985: Secreto militar
 1987: Hasta el sol de hoy
 1990: Obra completa
 Antología personal
 Los pesares juntos
 1994: Máscara suelta
 1995: El llanto de las cosas
 2011: Antología póstuma Honduras, poesía negra, editada por el Centro Cultural de España en Tegucigalpa y SEDINAFRO
 2016: Antología de la poesía amorosa hondureña

References

1930 births
2011 deaths
20th-century Honduran poets
20th-century male writers
Honduran male poets
People from Yoro Department
Academic staff of Universidad Nacional Autónoma de Honduras